The 1860 Grand National was the 22nd renewal of the Grand National horse race that took place at Aintree near Liverpool, England, on 7 March 1860.

Finishing Order

Non-finishers

References

 1860
Grand National
Grand National
19th century in Lancashire
March 1860 sports events